The Prodigal Judge is a 1922 American silent historical drama film directed by Edward José and starring Jean Paige, Macklyn Arbuckle and Ernest Torrence. It is based on the 1911 novel of the same title by Vaughn Kester.

Cast
 Jean Paige as Betty Malroy
 Macklyn Arbuckle as Judge Slocum Price
 Ernest Torrence as Solomon Mahaffy
 Earle Foxe as Bruce Carrington
 Arthur Edmund Carewe as Col. Fentress 
 Horace Braham as Charles Norton
 Charles Kent as Gen. Quintard
 Charles Eaton as Hannibal
 Robert Milasch as Bob Yancy
 George Bancroft as Cavendish
 Peggy Shanor as Bess Hicks
 Lillian Van Arsdale as Mrs. Cavendish
 Mary Curran as Mrs. Hicks

References

Bibliography
 Donald W. McCaffrey & Christopher P. Jacobs. Guide to the Silent Years of American Cinema. Greenwood Publishing, 1999.

External links
 

1922 films
American silent feature films
American black-and-white films
Films directed by Edward José
Vitagraph Studios films
Films set in the 1830s
American historical drama films
1920s historical drama films
1920s English-language films
1920s American films
Silent American drama films